TPC Las Vegas, formerly TPC at The Canyons, is an 18-hole golf course located in the planned community of Summerlin in western Las Vegas, Nevada.

Opened in 1996 and designed by Bobby Weed in consultation with tour professional Raymond Floyd, TPC Las Vegas is part of the PGA Tour's Tournament Players Club network. It was the venue for the Las Vegas Senior Classic, a tournament on the Champions Tour, from 1994 to 2001. The course was featured in the PS1 version of Tiger Woods PGA Tour 2001.

External links
 Official site

Golf clubs and courses in Nevada
Golf clubs and courses designed by Bobby Weed
Golf in Las Vegas
Buildings and structures in Summerlin, Nevada
1996 establishments in Nevada